The 2016–17 Biathlon World Cup – World Cup 9 was held in Holmenkollen, Oslo, Norway from 17 March until 19 March 2017.

Schedule of events

Medal winners

Men

Women

Achievements
 Best performance for all time

 , 1st place in Sprint

References 

2016–17 Biathlon World Cup
Biathlon World Cup
Biathlon World Cup
2010s in Oslo
Biathlon competitions in Norway
International sports competitions in Oslo